Snowshoe Lake is a lake in Kenora District, Ontario, and in Division No. 1, Manitoba, Canada, and part of the Nelson River drainage basin. The primary inflow is the Bird River from Chase Lake, and the primary outflow is the Bird River, to McGregor Lake, which flows via the Winnipeg River and the Nelson River into Hudson Bay. Small portions of the lake on the northwest, west and southwest, including the Bird River outflow, are in Nopiming Provincial Park in Manitoba.

See also
List of lakes in Ontario

References

Lakes of Manitoba
Lakes of Kenora District